Catalone Gut  is a community in the Canadian province of Nova Scotia, located in the Cape Breton Regional Municipality on Cape Breton Island. It is named after Gédéon de Catalogne, a French officer, who was a cartographer stationed at the Fortress of Louisbourg.

References

Catalone Gut on Destination Nova Scotia

Communities in the Cape Breton Regional Municipality
General Service Areas in Nova Scotia